BRZRKR is a comic book series created and written by Keanu Reeves and Matt Kindt and drawn by Ron Garney.  The comic follows an immortal warrior, known as Berzerker, as he fights his way through the ages. The first issue of the 12-issue limited series was published on March 3, 2021, by Boom! Studios. It raised more than $1.4 million USD in its funding campaign on Kickstarter.

Reception 
Issue #1 sold over 615,000 copies., making it the biggest selling single issue since Star Wars #1 in 2015. It received good reviews, with an average of 8.5/10 from 20 critics at ComicbookRoundup.

Collected editions

Adaptations
On March 22, 2021, Netflix announced it was developing a live-action film adaptation and a follow-up anime series based on the comics with Reeves cast as the lead. In October 2021, Mattson Tomlin was writing the live-action film adaptation.

In July 2022, during Keanu Reeves' panel at San Diego Comic-Con 2022, it was announced that the anime series adaptation will be produced by Production I.G and have two seasons.

References

Boom! Studios titles
Comics adapted into animated series
American comics adapted into films
2021 comics debuts
Kickstarter-funded publications
Production I.G